Doha Stadium (Etztadion Doḥa) is the current home of Bnei Sakhnin.

History
Located in the Israeli city of Sakhnin, Doha Stadium was built with public funds largely from the State of Israel and the Qatar National Olympic Committee, and was named after the Qatari city of Doha. The decision by the Qataris to build the stadium in Israel came after a meeting between the Knesset member Ahmad Tibi and Secretary-General of the Qatar National Olympic Committee Sheikh Saud Abdulrahman Al Thani after Tibi expressed his concern on the conditions for sport in Sakhnin. The involvement of Qatar was to show that relations between the two nations are peaceful and with a similar interest.

In July 2009, the north stand was opened with an additional 3,500 seats. There are plans to expand the stadium's capacity to 15,000.

See also
Sports in Israel

References

Football venues in Israel
Bnei Sakhnin F.C.
Sports venues completed in 2006
Sports venues in Northern District (Israel)